Public holidays in Laos are days when workers get the day off work.

Public holidays

Lunisolar public holidays

See also 
 List of festivals in Laos
 Culture of Laos#Festivals and public holidays

References

Laos
Laos
Events in Laos
Holidays